Idiothele mira, also known as the blue-foot baboon or the trap-door tarantula, is a species of tarantula endemic to South Africa and is popularized by hobbyists for the striking blue coloration on the ventral side of the tarsi and metatarsi on each leg. Furthermore, the species is well known for belonging to one of two described genera of theraphosids that build a trapdoor, the other being Typhochlaena.

Description 
Idiothele mira is a small species, mature females reaching 4.5 inches in diagonal leg span and is very reclusive, rarely leaving its burrow, usually only for mating purposes. This species is easily distinguished by its bright blue "toes" or tarsi and metatarsi, paired with a black and golden carapace, gold radiating within black in a "starburst" pattern, the abdomen is also golden with black speckling. Males have a smaller body size when compared to the leg span, and reach 3.5 inches on average. The eggsac of Idiothele mira commonly contains 25-45 spiderlings. The type specimen is a mature female found in the Ndumo Game Farm of South Africa, an area that has high summer rainfall followed by extremely dry winters.

Etymology 
From the Latin for "wonderful", referring to the sky-blue coloration on the tarsi and metatarsi.

References 

Endemic fauna of South Africa
Theraphosidae
Spiders of South Africa
Spiders described in 2010